Jedediah Brown was a member of the Wisconsin State Assembly during the 1848 and 1849 sessions. A resident of Sheboygan Falls, Wisconsin, he represented Sheboygan County, Wisconsin. He was a Democrat.

References

People from Sheboygan Falls, Wisconsin
Year of birth missing
Year of death missing
Democratic Party members of the Wisconsin State Assembly